John Kay Carmack (born May 10, 1931) has been a general authority of the Church of Jesus Christ of Latter-day Saints (LDS Church) since 1984. He is currently an emeritus general authority and was the managing director of the church's Perpetual Education Fund from 2001 to 2012.

Biographical background
Carmack was born in Winslow, Arizona. After attending Brigham Young University (BYU) for two years, Carmack served as an LDS Church missionary in the Western Central States Mission of the church. Upon returning home, he completed his arts degree at BYU and went on to obtain a law degree at the University of California at Los Angeles. Carmack joined a law firm in Los Angeles, eventually becoming the firm's president. Carmack also served briefly in the United States military in Korea.

Carmack is married to Shirley Fay Allen and they are the parents of six children.

In the church, Carmack served in a variety of callings, including president of the Los Angeles California Stake of the church and as a Regional Representative of the Twelve Apostles. In 1981, Carmack was appointed to preside over the Idaho Boise Mission of the church.

General authority
In 1984, Carmack became a member of the First Quorum of the Seventy. In 1989, he was made executive director of the church's Historical Department. As a general authority, Carmack performed the groundbreaking for four LDS Church temples: the Hong Kong China Temple, the Louisville Kentucky Temple, the Nashville Tennessee Temple, and The Hague Netherlands Temple.

In 2001, Carmack was given emeritus status and released from his duties as a Seventy. Upon Carmack's release, church president Gordon B. Hinckley immediately asked Carmack to become the first managing director of the church's new Perpetual Education Fund. He served in this position until 2012, when he was succeeded by Robert C. Gay.

Carmack was very active in publicizing about the Perpetual Education Fund and related efforts. On one occasion he suggested that future LDS general conferences may be held outside the US.

Publications
 John K. Carmack (2004). A Bright Ray of Hope: The Perpetual Education Fund (Salt Lake City, Utah: Deseret Book) 
 —— (1993). Tolerance: Principles, Practices, Obstacles, Limits (Salt Lake City, Utah: Bookcraft) 
 ——, "Unmeasured Factors of Success" in Galen L. Fletcher & Jane H. Wise (eds.) (2002). Life in the Law: Answering God's Interrogatories (Provo, Utah: BYU Press) 

Carmack has also written articles for BYU Studies and the Mormon Historical Sites foundation on the 19th-century era of the history of The Church of Jesus Christ of Latter-day Saints.

Notes

References
 "Elder John K. Carmack of the First Quorum of the Seventy," Ensign, May 1984, 91
 Walch, Tad. "An LDS Conference Outside the U.S.?", Deseret Morning News, 2007-04-03

External links
 Grampa Bill's G.A. Pages: John K. Carmack

1931 births
American lawyers
American Mormon missionaries in the United States
Brigham Young University alumni
Members of the First Quorum of the Seventy (LDS Church)
Living people
People from Winslow, Arizona
Regional representatives of the Twelve
UCLA School of Law alumni
20th-century Mormon missionaries
American general authorities (LDS Church)
Mission presidents (LDS Church)
Religious leaders from Arizona
Latter Day Saints from Arizona
Latter Day Saints from California